The Dar al Gani (also known as DaG) is a meteorite field in the Libyan Sahara.

Dark-colored meteorites can be easily spotted in this field, where they have also been well preserved due to the arid climate, and favorable geology consisting of basic rocks (clays, dolomites, and limestones) and lacking erosive quartz sand.

The name Dar al Gani was given by the nomenclature committee of the Meteoritical Society. It does not exist in the National Atlas of Libya. However, the name Dur al Ghani was given to part of the Sarir al Qattusah plateau in the geological map of Libya.

See also
 Glossary of meteoritics

References 

Strewn field (meteorite)
Geography of Libya